The Buffalo Germans was an early basketball team formed in 1895 at a YMCA on Buffalo's East Side.  Team members included Dr. Fred Burkhardt (coach), Philip Dischinger, Henry J. Faust, Alfred A. Heerdt (captain), Edward Linneborn, John I. Maier, Albert W. Manweiler, Edward C. Miller, Harry J. Miller, Charles P. Monahan, George L. Redlein, Edmund Reimann, Williams C. Rhode and George Schell.

Chuck Taylor claimed to play as a forward for the Germans as well as the Akron Firestones and the New York Celtics in industrial league basketball for 11 years between 1918 and 1930.  There is no documentary evidence to support this contention.  

The team was elected to the Basketball Hall of Fame in 1961, and is now one of only twelve teams to be elected as a whole.

In 1904 the team won the AAU national tournament, which served as a demonstration sport at the St. Louis Olympics.

From 1908 to 1910 the team won 111 straight games.

The team was disbanded in 1925 after compiling a 792–86 record.

External links 
Naismith Memorial Hall of Fame profile
Hoopedia article

References

Sports in Buffalo, New York
Naismith Memorial Basketball Hall of Fame inductees
Defunct basketball teams in the United States
Sports clubs founded by the YMCA